Konradowo may refer to the following places:
Konradowo, Kuyavian-Pomeranian Voivodeship (north-central Poland)
Konradowo, Nowa Sól County in Lubusz Voivodeship (west Poland)
Konradowo, Wschowa County in Lubusz Voivodeship (west Poland)
Konradowo, Pomeranian Voivodeship (north Poland)
Konradowo, Warmian-Masurian Voivodeship (north Poland)